Bridgeland/Memorial station is a CTrain light rail in Calgary, Alberta. It serves the Northeast Line (Route 202). It opened on April 27, 1985, as part of the original Northeast line. The station is located in the median of Memorial Drive Northeast, 1.4 km from the City Hall Interlocking.  A pedestrian overpass connects the station to both sides of Memorial Drive and stairs and escalators, as well as an elevator provide access down to the center-loading platform. 

In 2004 and 2005, the station underwent upgrading and renovations to improve safety and access for visually impaired users wishing to access the nearby CNIB facility, and also in preparation for increased usage as work on The Bridges - a major inner city redevelopment project on the north side of the station - progressed. The station was closed for a couple of weeks in the summer of 2004 due to the construction.

As part of Calgary Transit's plan to operate 4-car trains by the end of 2014, all 3-car platforms were extended. Construction on the extension of the platform at Bridgeland/Memorial started and was finished in 2014.

In 2005, the station registered an average transit of 1,300 boardings per weekday.

In the Media

In 1993, a re-enactment of an incident involving a 4-year-old child becoming entrapped by an escalator was filmed in the station for the TV show "Rescue 911".  Although the incident actually occurred at Rundle LRT station, this station was chosen for having an identical layout and more aesthetically pleasing visuals.

References

CTrain stations
Railway stations in Canada opened in 1985